Episcepsis erynnis is a moth of the family Erebidae. It was described by Johan Christian Fabricius in 1777. It is found in Suriname.

References

Euchromiina
Moths described in 1777